Inland with Sturt is a 1951 documentary from Film Australia consisting of the 1950–51 re-enactment of Captain Charles Sturt's 1829–30 expedition down the Murrumbidgee and Murray Rivers. The re-enactment was part of Australia's 1951 Commonwealth Jubilee Celebrations, commemorating 50 years of Federation.

Production

The parts of Charles Sturt and George Macleay were performed by two professional actors, Grant Taylor and Rod Taylor. Several officers from Duntroon played the men who travelled with them.

The expedition took several weeks, travelling from Sydney to Adelaide. The crew travelled by road to the town of Maude, then entered the Murrumbidgee River in a whaleboat and went by water to Goolwa, after which they drove to Adelaide. All the time they wore 1830 period costume.

An extensive support crew accompanied the whaleboat from land, including Talbot Duckmanton and a team from ABC radio who would present a nightly report. The trip was also covered extensively by local media and seen by an estimated 300,000 people along the way.

Inland with Sturt marked the first film appearance for Rod Taylor, who, although he played George Macleay, was actually related to Charles Sturt through his father; he was Sturt's great-great-grandnephew. He was cast only after the original choice for his role, Charles Tingwell, pulled out to act in Kangaroo (1952).

Cast
Grant Taylor as Captain Charles Sturt
Rod Taylor as George Macleay
Pat Trost
Ian Gilmore
Roy Pugh
Captain Jim Laughlin
Ron Wells
Brien Forward

References

External links

Inland with Sturt Part 1 and Inland with Sturt Pt 2 at The Duntroon Society Newsletter November 2000 and April 2001.
Inland with Sturt at National Film and Sound Archive
[http://rodtaylorsite.com/sturtexpedition.shtml Inland with Sturt] at The Rod Taylor Site

1951 films
1950s English-language films